The 2008–09 Honduran Liga Nacional de Ascenso was the 42nd season of the Second level in Honduran football and the 7th under the name Liga Nacional de Ascenso.  Under the management of Javier Padilla, Atlético Gualala F.C. won the tournament after defeating C.D. Necaxa in the promotion series and obtained promotion to the 2009–10 Honduran Liga Nacional.  They later however, merged with C.D. Real Juventud, who had been relegated from the top level, and play in 2009–10 as Real Juventud.

Apertura

Regular season

Standings

Postseason

Quarterfinals

 Atlético Gualala won 2–1 on aggregated.

 Necaxa won 2–0 on aggregated.

 Municipal Silca won 4–2 on aggregated.

 Unión Ájax won 7–3 on aggregated.

Semifinals

 Atlético Gualala won 5–4 on aggregated.

 Municipal Silca 1–1 Unión Ájax on aggregated.  Municipal Silca won 5–4 on penalty shoot-outs.

Final

 Atlético Gualala won 5–3 on aggregated.

Clausura

Regular season

Standings

Postseason

Quarterfinals

 Necaxa won 2–1 on aggregated.

 Social Sol won 2–1 on aggregated.

 Atlético Olanchano won 4–2 on aggregated.

 Olimpia Occidental won 4–3 on aggregated.

Semifinals

 Necaxa won 3–2 on aggregated.

 Social Sol won 2–1 on aggregated.

Final

 Necaxa 2–2 Social Sol on aggregated.  Necaxa won 4–1 on penalty shoot-outs.

Promotion

 Atlético Gualala won 2–1 on aggregated.

References

Ascenso
2008